Anthony Nicolas Michel Deroin (born 15 March 1979) is a French former professional footballer who played his entire career for Stade Malherbe Caen as a midfielder.

Career
Deroin spent his whole career with Stade Malherbe Caen, from 1997 to 2012, scoring 35 goals in 368 appearances (9 goals in 102 in Ligue 1). He was promoted in French Ligue 1 with his club in 2004, 2007 and 2010.

In 2008, he surpassed Yvan Lebourgeois's record of 320 appearances for Caen. Nicolas Seube since broke the record and became the club's all-time leader in appearances.

See also
List of one-club men

References

External links

1979 births
Living people
Footballers from Caen
French footballers
Association football midfielders
Stade Malherbe Caen players
Ligue 1 players
Ligue 2 players